Ernest Allan Hicke (born November 7, 1947) is a Canadian former professional ice hockey forward who played in the National Hockey League (NHL) with the Oakland Seals, Atlanta Flames, New York Islanders, Minnesota North Stars and Los Angeles Kings. 

He left the NHL after the 1978 season, then retired as an active player at end of the 1980 season.

Playing career
Born in Regina, Saskatchewan, Hicke's hockey career began with the Regina Pats, where he played junior hockey. After five years, Hicke's first professional appearance was with the Houston Apollos of the Central Hockey League (CHL). In Hicke's first three professional seasons, he scored 45 goals and 63 assists in 139 games. Originally a member of the Montreal Canadiens organization, Hicke was traded to the Oakland Seals in the deal that included the draft pick the Canadiens used to draft Guy Lafleur. Hicke's NHL career started with the Seals in 1970, where he joined his older brother, Bill, and played 146 games, producing 33 goals and 37 assists. He was then claimed in the 1972 NHL Expansion Draft by the Atlanta Flames. After a single season in Atlanta, he was traded to the Flames' expansion partners, the New York Islanders. Hicke played 76 games with New York, but only managed to score 21 points for the team, the worst scoring slump of his career. Hicke's production improved after being traded to the Minnesota North Stars, with 68 goals and 53 assists. After four seasons with the North Stars, Hicke was signed by the Los Angeles Kings. He left the NHL after the 1978 season and went to play for the CHL's Dallas Black Hawks. Hicke ended his hockey career with another 8 goals and 24 assists, before he retired as a player after the 1980 season.

Post-playing career
Hicke went on to coach the California North Stars, a San Francisco Bay Area youth hockey team, with his son Shane. Hicke is the former head coach, and general manager of the Port Huron Fighting Falcons. He served as a coach the DYHA Jr. Sundevils U14 A team in Tempe, Arizona in 2016–17.

Career statistics

Regular season and playoffs

References

External links

1947 births
Living people
Atlanta Flames players
Binghamton Dusters players
California Golden Seals players
Canadian ice hockey left wingers
Dallas Black Hawks players
Houston Apollos players
Ice hockey people from Saskatchewan
Los Angeles Kings players
Minnesota North Stars players
New York Islanders players
Regina Pats players
Salt Lake Golden Eagles (CHL) players
Springfield Indians players
Sportspeople from Regina, Saskatchewan